Ceratozamia zaragozae is a species of plant in the family Zamiaceae. It is endemic to the Rio Verde in El Capulín, San Luis Potosí state in northeastern Mexico. It is a Critically endangered species, threatened by habitat loss. It is found southwest of the Rio Verde, in Capulin district.

References

zaragozae
Endemic flora of Mexico
Flora of San Luis Potosí
Critically endangered plants
Endangered biota of Mexico
Taxonomy articles created by Polbot